Ernest Gogel (8 December 1911 – 27 July 1977) was a Swiss wrestler. He competed in the men's Greco-Roman middleweight at the 1936 Summer Olympics.

References

External links
 

1911 births
1977 deaths
Swiss male sport wrestlers
Olympic wrestlers of Switzerland
Wrestlers at the 1936 Summer Olympics
Place of birth missing
20th-century Swiss people